"I Wanna Be Sedated" is a song by American punk rock band Ramones, originally released on the band's fourth studio album, Road to Ruin (1978), in September 1978. The B-side of the UK single "She's the One" was released on September 21, 1978. The song was later released as a single in the Netherlands in 1979, then in the U.S. in 1980 by RSO Records from the Times Square soundtrack album.

The song has since then remained one of the band's best known songs.

History
"I Wanna Be Sedated" was written by Joey Ramone. In an interview about the song, Joey explains the chorus:

Music video
The music video for the song, directed by Bill Fishman, was released in September 1988, about ten years after the song was originally released, to promote the compilation album Ramones Mania. The iconic video features the Ramones sitting at a table (left to right: Johnny, Joey, Marky and Dee Dee), nonchalantly reading and eating generic corn flakes (branded "Corn Flakes") while the background hallway erupts into a venue for nuns, acrobats, ballerinas, monsters, cheerleaders, clowns, doctors, fetish nurses, and smoking schoolgirls. The film is intentionally sped up to show the excitement of the background, while the band's actions are in regular motion. This was achieved by having the band members move very slowly, while the crowd moved normally, and then speeding up the film. (Furthermore, one of the video's characters is a young Courtney Love.)

A still from the video was featured in the liner notes of the band’s 1989 album Brain Drain, though the song itself does not appear on that album.

Reception
"I Wanna Be Sedated" was number 145 on the Rolling Stone'''s 500 Greatest Songs of All Time. Marky Ramone is the drummer on this track.

In 1999, National Public Radio included the song in the "NPR 100", in which NPR's music editors sought to compile the one hundred most important American musical works of the 20th century.

Kelefa Sanneh said of the song, "I loved it because it seemed like the beginning of a tradition, pointing away from all the conventional thing a rock 'n' roll band might do, and pointing toward anything and everything else."

According to Alice Cooper, Joey Ramone acknowledged the similarity to Cooper's earlier 1972 song "Elected," explaining that the Ramones listened to a lot of Alice Cooper.

Cover version
 English punk rock band The Adicts covered the song in the mid-'80s when they were on Sire although it wasn't released until the 1992 compilation Totally Adicted. It was later included as a bonus track on some versions of Sound of Music.

In popular culture
 Ramones Time: At 12:00 am on December 31, 2020, many people posted that it was, "2020, 24 hours to go."
 The song was featured in the penultimate episode of The Magicians'', which aired on 25 March 2020, sung by most of the cast during a heist operation in a musical episode.

Certifications

References

1978 songs
1978 singles
Ramones songs
Songs written by Joey Ramone
Song recordings produced by Ed Stasium
Song recordings produced by Tommy Ramone
Songs about drugs
Sire Records singles